The Office Open XML format (OOXML), is an open and free document file format for saving and exchanging editable office documents such as text documents (including memos, reports, and books), spreadsheets, charts, and presentations.

The following tables list applications supporting a version of the Office Open XML standard (ECMA-376 and ISO/IEC 29500:2008).

Text documents

Word processors
Word processors listed on a light purple background are discontinued.

Other applications
Besides word processors, other programs can and do support the Office Open XML text format. See the list of software that supports Office Open XML for more.

Spreadsheet documents

Presentation documents

See also 
 Comparison of office suites
 Comparison of word processors
 Open format

References

External links 
 Microsoft's office open XML Community website
Kingsoft Office 

Office Open XML

Office Open XML support